Miranda Downes (27 February 1950 – 3 August 1985) was an Australian screenwriter. Ernest Arthur Knibb was convicted of her murder.

Miranda (known as Mandy) attended Cumberland High School (Carlingford).  She was awarded a Bachelor of Arts from the University of New South Wales.  Subsequently, she completed a course in "script writing" at the National Institute for Dramatic Arts (NIDA).

She worked as a production secretary in the film industry when she wrote an original script, Undercover (1983). She later started working on a script called Cane about Italian cane cutters in Queensland, when she was murdered on a beach north of Cairns. Ernest Knibb was arrested after an investigation by the TV show 60 Minutes.

Cane became the mini series Fields of Fire.

Select Credits
Undercover (1983)
First Love - "The House That Jack Built"
The Last Resort (1988)
Fields of Fire

References

External links

Australian women screenwriters
1985 deaths
People murdered in Queensland
1950 births
20th-century Australian screenwriters
20th-century Australian women